Cornelia Laws St. John (Williams; after first marriage, Laws; after second marriage, St. John; died February 24, 1902) was an American poet and biographer. She was the author of "Over the Shoulder to Clovernook, Being a Backward Glance at Alice and Phoebe Cary in Their Early Home". Her best known poem was "Six Little Feet on the Fender".

Biography
Cornelia Ellicott Williams was born in College Hill, Ohio, near Cincinnati. Her father was M. C. Williams of College Hill. She had at least one sibling, a brother, Wilber W. Williams, who became the pay inspector of the U.S. Navy.

She was educated at the Ohio Female College, at College Hill, where she received high marks for the elegance of her composition, in prose and verse, and for skill in music.

St. John was married first, in 1857, at Syracuse, New York, to Joseph P. Laws, a merchant of Richmond, Indiana, where they resided after marriage. It was during her residence in that city that many of her most popular poems were written.

Her poems appeared in the Cincinnati Commercial Tribune, the St. Louis Democrat, and Journal, and some of them were extensively copied by the press. She first published, "The Empty Chair", in 1856; the next year, "Six Little Feet on the Fender" and "Behind the Post". Of "The Empty Chair", as it first appeared in the Cincinnati Commercial Tribune, George Washington Cutter thus wrote to that paper:— 

Some years after the decease of Mr. Laws, she married secondly, Mr. St. John, and then made her home in Chicago. Later, she mourned the death of her second daughter, Mae Bramhall, the author of Japanese Jingles and The Wee Ones of Japan.

St. John is best known by her verses entitled, "Six Little Feet on the Fender". She was also the author of "Over the Shoulder to Clovernook, Being a Backward Glance at Alice and PHoebe Cary in Their Early Home" (1892).

St. John died in New York City, 24 February 1902.

"Six Little Feet on the Fender"
In my heart there liveth a picture, 
   Of a kitchen rude and old, 
Where the firelight tripped o'er the rafters,
   And reddened the roof's brown mould; 
Gilding the steam from the kettle
   That hummed on the foot-worn hearth, 
Throughout all the livelong evening
   Its measure of drowsy mirth.

Selected works

Poems
 "The Empty Chair", 1856
 "Six Little Feet on the Fender", 1857 (by Cornelia W. Laws)
 "Behind the Post", 1857

Articles
 "Over the Shoulder to Clovernook, Being a Backward Glance at Alice and PHoebe Cary in Their Early Home.", 1892 (by Cornelia Laws-St. John)

References

Attribution
 
 
 
 

19th-century births
1902 deaths
19th-century American poets
19th-century American women writers
Poets from Ohio
Writers from Cincinnati
American women poets
Year of birth unknown